Chorisodontium is a genus of mosses belonging to the family Dicranaceae.

The species of this genus are found in New Zealand and South America.

Species:
 Chorisodontium aciphyllum Brotherus, 1924 
 Chorisodontium burrowsii Allison, 1963

References

Dicranales
Moss genera